CEAS is an abbreviation that may stand for: (in alphabetic order)

In English 
 Centre for East Asian Studies or Center for East Asian Studies, a common name for academic hubs focusing on East Asian studies at universities worldwide
 Common European Asylum System managed by the European Asylum Support Office
 Council of European Aerospace Societies
 Conference on Email and Anti-Spam
 Corporate Emergency Access System
 Council of European Aerospace Societies
 N2-(2-carboxyethyl)arginine synthase, an enzyme
 Centre for European Agricultural Studies at Wye College

In French 
 Centre écologique Albert Schweitzer a non-governmental Swiss organisation for humanitarian and development aid
 Centre d’étude et d’Action Sociales d’Alsace